Creative Adult is an American rock band formed in 2012 in the North Bay, California.

History
Creative Adult began in 2012 with the release of their debut EP titled Dead Air via their own Broke Hatrè Records. They released their second EP titled Bulls In The Yard the following year.

In 2014, the band released the 'Deep End' single. Also in 2014, the band released their debut full-length album titled Psychic Mess via Run For Cover, having traveled to Montreal's Hotel2Tango to record with Efrim Menuck. The album received generally favorable reviews, NME citing the band's "exploratory, intense" nature.

In 2015 the band released a split 7-inch EP with Self Defense Family, both bands contributing one song. They also released a split with the band Wild Moth, as well as the Ring Around The Room EP.

The band has toured the United States with acts such as Ceremony, Self Defense Family, Japanther, Makthaverskan, Tony Molina, and Soulside.

Members
Scott Phillips
RJ Phillips
Michael Bingham
James Rogers
Michael Fenton
Anthony Anzaldo

Discography
Studio albums
Psychic Mess (2014, Run for Cover)
Fear of Life (2016, Run for Cover)
EPs
Dead Air (2012, Broke Hatrè)
Bulls in the Yard (2013, Run for Cover)
Ring Around the Room (2015, Run for Cover)
Singles
"Northern Exile" (2013, Broke Hatrè)
"Deep End" (2014, Run for Cover)
Splits
Creative Adult/Self Defense Family (2015, Deathwish Inc.)
Creative Adult/Wild Moth (2015, Broke Hatrè)

References

Musical groups from San Francisco
Musical groups established in 2012
Run for Cover Records artists
2012 establishments in California